HMS C1 was one of 38 C-class submarines built for the Royal Navy in the first decade of the 20th century. The boat survived the First World War and was sold for scrap in 1920.

Design and description
The C class was essentially a repeat of the preceding B class, albeit with better performance underwater. They displaced  on the surface and  submerged. The C-class submarines had a crew of two officers and fourteen ratings.

For surface running, the boats were powered by a single 16-cylinder  Vickers petrol engine that drove one propeller shaft. When submerged the propeller was driven by a  electric motor. They could reach  on the surface and  underwater.

The boats were armed with two 18-inch (45 cm) torpedo tubes in the bow. They could carry a pair of reload torpedoes, but generally did not as they would have to remove an equal weight of fuel in compensation.

Construction and career
C1 was built by Vickers at their Barrow-in-Furness shipyard, laid down on 13 November 1905, launched 10 July 1906 and was commissioned on 30 October 1906. The boat was equipped with wireless telegraphy. She was converted to a surface patrol boat and renamed S8 for Adriatic service. On 23 April 1918, she was packed with dynamite to be blown up at Zeebrugge Mole. However, this did not happen. C1 was sold 22 October 1920 to Stanlee, and resold 14 November 1921 to Young, Sunderland.

Notes

References

External links 
 MaritimeQuest HMS C-1 Pages

 

Ships built in Barrow-in-Furness
British C-class submarines
Royal Navy ship names
1906 ships